Hurlyburly is a 1984 dark comedy play by David Rabe.

Hurlyburly and orthographically similar terms may also refer to:
 Hurlyburly (film), 1998 film adaptation of the play
 Hurly Burly, a burlesque dance troupe formed by Miss Polly Rae
 "Hurly Burly", b-side of "Spending All My Time" by the Japanese girl group Perfume
 Hurly-Burly (journal), a psychoanalysis journal
 Hurley Burley, an American racehorse